Paul Alan Roberts (born 29 July 1977) is a Welsh former footballer who mostly played in the League of Wales, scoring over 100 goals.

He has played in the English football league, making just 1 substitute appearance for then-Second Division side Wrexham.

Internationally, he has been capped for the Wales under-21 national football team.

References

Living people
1977 births
Sportspeople from Gwynedd
Porthmadog F.C. players
Wrexham A.F.C. players
Bangor City F.C. players
Rhyl F.C. players
Welshpool Town F.C. players
Newtown A.F.C. players
Welsh footballers
Association football forwards
Wales under-21 international footballers